The El Dorado Province is one of ten provinces of the San Martín Region in northern Peru.

Political division
The province is divided into five districts.
 Agua Blanca (Agua Blanca)
 San José de Sisa (San José de Sisa)
 San Martín (San Martín)
 Santa Rosa (Santa Rosa)
 Shatoja (Shatoja)

Provinces of the San Martín Region